The 2023 Kansas City Royals season will be the 55th season for the franchise, and their 51st at Kauffman Stadium.

Offseason
The Royals finished the 2022 season 65–97, 27 games out of first place. They missed the playoffs for the seventh consecutive season.

On October 5, 2022, the Royals fired manager Mike Matheny shortly after the season ended. Matheny went  over three seasons with the team.

Rule changes 
Pursuant to the CBA, new rule changes will be in place for the 2023 season:

 institution of a pitch clock between pitches;
 limits on pickoff attempts per plate appearance;
 limits on defensive shifts requiring two infielders to be on either side of second and be within the boundary of the infield; and
 larger bases (increased to 18-inch squares);

Regular season

Game log

|- style="background: 
| 1 || March 30 || Twins || – || || || — || || – || 
|- style="background: 
| 2 || April 1 || Twins || – || || || — || || – ||
|- style="background: 
| 3 || April 2 || Twins || – || || || — || || – ||
|- style="background: 
| 4 || April 3 || Blue Jays || – || || || — || || – ||
|- style="background: 
| 5 || April 4 || Blue Jays || – || || || — || || – ||
|- style="background: 
| 6 || April 5 || Blue Jays || – || || || — || || – ||
|- style="background: 
| 7 || April 6 || Blue Jays || – || || || — || || – ||
|- style="background: 
| 8 || April 7 || @ Giants || – || || || — || || – ||
|- style="background: 
| 9 || April 8 || @ Giants || – || || || — || || – ||
|- style="background: 
| 10 || April 9 || @ Giants || – || || || — || || – ||
|- style="background: 
| 11 || April 10 || @ Rangers || – || || || — || || – ||
|- style="background: 
| 12 || April 11 || @ Rangers || – || || || — || || – ||
|- style="background: 
| 13 || April 12 || @ Rangers || – || || || — || || – ||
|- style="background: 
| 14 || April 14 || Braves || – || || || — || || – ||
|- style="background: 
| 15 || April 15 || Braves || – || || || — || || – ||
|- style="background: 
| 16 || April 16 || Braves || – || || || — || || – ||
|- style="background: 
| 17 || April 17 || Rangers || – || || || — || || – ||
|- style="background: 
| 18 || April 18 || Rangers || – || || || — || || – ||
|- style="background: 
| 19 || April 19 || Rangers || – || || || — || || – ||
|- style="background: 
| 20 || April 21 || @ Angels || – || || || — || || – ||
|- style="background: 
| 21 || April 22 || @ Angels || – || || || — || || – ||
|- style="background: 
| 22 || April 23 || @ Angels || – || || || — || || – ||
|- style="background: 
| 23 || April 24 || @ Diamondbacks || – || || || — || || – ||
|- style="background: 
| 24 || April 25 || @ Diamondbacks || – || || || — || || – ||
|- style="background: 
| 25 || April 26 || @ Diamondbacks || – || || || — || || – ||
|- style="background: 
| 26 || April 27 || @ Twins || – || || || — || || – ||
|- style="background: 
| 27 || April 28 || @ Twins || – || || || — || || – ||
|- style="background: 
| 28 || April 29 || @ Twins || – || || || — || || – ||
|- style="background: 
| 29 || April 30 || @ Twins || – || || || — || || – ||
|- 
 

|- style="background: 
| 30 || May 2 || Orioles || – || || || — || || – ||
|- style="background: 
| 31 || May 3 || Orioles || – || || || — || || – ||
|- style="background: 
| 32 || May 4 || Orioles || – || || || — || || – ||
|- style="background: 
| 33 || May 5 || Athletics || – || || || — || || – ||
|- style="background: 
| 34 || May 6 || Athletics || – || || || — || || – ||
|- style="background: 
| 35 || May 7 || Athletics || – || || || — || || – ||
|- style="background: 
| 36 || May 8 || White Sox || – || || || — || || – ||
|- style="background: 
| 37 || May 9 || White Sox || – || || || — || || – ||
|- style="background: 
| 38 || May 10 || White Sox || – || || || — || || – ||
|- style="background: 
| 39 || May 11 || White Sox || – || || || — || || – ||
|- style="background: 
| 40 || May 12 || @ Brewers || – || || || — || || – ||
|- style="background: 
| 41 || May 13 || @ Brewers || – || || || — || || – ||
|- style="background: 
| 42 || May 14 || @ Brewers || – || || || — || || – ||
|- style="background: 
| 43 || May 15 || @ Padres || – || || || — || || – ||
|- style="background: 
| 44 || May 16 || @ Padres || – || || || — || || – ||
|- style="background: 
| 45 || May 17 || @ Padres || – || || || — || || – ||
|- style="background: 
| 46 || May 19 || @ White Sox || – || || || — || || – ||
|- style="background: 
| 47 || May 20 || @ White Sox || – || || || — || || – ||
|- style="background: 
| 48 || May 21 || @ White Sox || – || || || — || || – ||
|- style="background: 
| 49 || May 22 || Tigers || – || || || — || || – ||
|- style="background: 
| 50 || May 23 || Tigers || – || || || — || || – ||
|- style="background: 
| 51 || May 24 || Tigers || – || || || — || || – ||
|- style="background: 
| 52 || May 26 || Nationals || – || || || — || || – ||
|- style="background: 
| 53 || May 27 || Nationals || – || || || — || || – ||
|- style="background: 
| 54 || May 28 || Nationals || – || || || — || || – ||
|- style="background: 
| 55 || May 29 || @ Cardinals || – || || || — || || – ||
|- style="background: 
| 56 || May 30 || @ Cardinals || – || || || — || || – ||
|- 
 

|- style="background: 
| 57 || June 2 || Rockies || – || || || — || || – ||
|- style="background: 
| 58 || June 3 || Rockies || – || || || — || || – ||
|- style="background: 
| 59 || June 4 || Rockies || – || || || — || || – ||
|- style="background: 
| 60 || June 5 || @ Marlins || – || || || — || || – ||
|- style="background: 
| 61 || June 6 || @ Marlins || – || || || — || || – ||
|- style="background: 
| 62 || June 7 || @ Marlins || – || || || — || || – ||
|- style="background: 
| 63 || June 9 || @ Orioles || – || || || — || || – ||
|- style="background: 
| 64 || June 10 || @ Orioles || – || || || — || || – ||
|- style="background: 
| 65 || June 11 || @ Orioles || – || || || — || || – ||
|- style="background: 
| 66 || June 12 || Reds || – || || || — || || – ||
|- style="background: 
| 67 || June 13 || Reds || – || || || — || || – ||
|- style="background: 
| 68 || June 14 || Reds || – || || || — || || – ||
|- style="background: 
| 69 || June 16 || Angels || – || || || — || || – ||
|- style="background: 
| 70 || June 17 || Angels || – || || || — || || – ||
|- style="background: 
| 71 || June 18 || Angels || – || || || — || || – ||
|- style="background: 
| 72 || June 19 || @ Tigers || – || || || — || || – ||
|- style="background: 
| 73 || June 20 || @ Tigers || – || || || — || || – ||
|- style="background: 
| 74 || June 21 || @ Tigers || – || || || — || || – ||
|- style="background: 
| 75 || June 22 || @ Rays || – || || || — || || – ||
|- style="background: 
| 76 || June 23 || @ Rays || – || || || — || || – ||
|- style="background: 
| 77 || June 24 || @ Rays || – || || || — || || – ||
|- style="background: 
| 78 || June 25 || @ Rays || – || || || — || || – ||
|- style="background: 
| 79 || June 27 || Guardians || – || || || — || || – ||
|- style="background: 
| 80 || June 28 || Guardians || – || || || — || || – ||
|- style="background: 
| 81 || June 29 || Guardians || – || || || — || || – ||
|- style="background: 
| 82 || June 30 || Dodgers || – || || || — || || – ||
|- 
 

|- style="background: 
| 83 || July 1 || Dodgers || – || || || — || || – ||
|- style="background: 
| 84 || July 2 || Dodgers || – || || || — || || – ||
|- style="background: 
| 85 || July 3 || @ Twins || – || || || — || || – ||
|- style="background: 
| 86 || July 4 || @ Twins || – || || || — || || – ||
|- style="background: 
| 87 || July 5 || @ Twins || – || || || — || || – ||
|- style="background: 
| 88 || July 6 || @ Guardians || – || || || — || || – ||
|- style="background: 
| 89 || July 7 || @ Guardians || – || || || — || || – ||
|- style="background: 
| 90 || July 8 || @ Guardians || – || || || — || || – ||
|- style="background: 
| 91 || July 9 || @ Guardians || – || || || — || || – ||
|- style="text-align:center; background:#bbcaff;"
| colspan="11" | 93rd All-Star Game in Seattle, Washington
|- style="background: 
| 92 || July 14 || Rays || – || || || — || || – ||
|- style="background: 
| 93 || July 15 || Rays || – || || || — || || – ||
|- style="background: 
| 94 || July 16 || Rays || – || || || — || || – ||
|- style="background: 
| 95 || July 17 || Tigers || – || || || — || || – ||
|- style="background: 
| 96 || July 18 || Tigers || – || || || — || || – ||
|- style="background: 
| 97 || July 19 || Tigers || – || || || — || || – ||
|- style="background: 
| 98 || July 20 || Tigers || – || || || — || || – ||
|- style="background: 
| 99 || July 21 || @ Yankees || – || || || — || || – ||
|- style="background: 
| 100 || July 22 || @ Yankees || – || || || — || || – ||
|- style="background: 
| 101 || July 23 || @ Yankees || – || || || — || || – ||
|- style="background: 
| 102 || July 24 || @ Guardians || – || || || — || || – ||
|- style="background: 
| 103 || July 25 || @ Guardians || – || || || — || || – ||
|- style="background: 
| 104 || July 26 || @ Guardians || – || || || — || || – ||
|- style="background: 
| 105 || July 28 || Twins || – || || || — || || – ||
|- style="background: 
| 106 || July 29 || Twins || – || || || — || || – ||
|- style="background: 
| 107 || July 30 || Twins || – || || || — || || – ||
|- 
 

|- style="background: 
| 108 || August 1 || Mets || – || || || — || || – ||
|- style="background: 
| 109 || August 2 || Mets || – || || || — || || – ||
|- style="background: 
| 110 || August 3 || Mets || – || || || — || || – ||
|- style="background: 
| 111 || August 4 || @ Phillies || – || || || — || || – ||
|- style="background: 
| 112 || August 5 || @ Phillies || – || || || — || || – ||
|- style="background: 
| 113 || August 6 || @ Phillies || – || || || — || || – ||
|- style="background: 
| 114 || August 7 || @ Red Sox || – || || || — || || – ||
|- style="background: 
| 115 || August 8 || @ Red Sox || – || || || — || || – ||
|- style="background: 
| 116 || August 9 || @ Red Sox || – || || || — || || – ||
|- style="background: 
| 117 || August 10 || @ Red Sox || – || || || — || || – ||
|- style="background: 
| 118 || August 11 || Cardinals || – || || || — || || – ||
|- style="background: 
| 119 || August 12 || Cardinals || – || || || — || || – ||
|- style="background: 
| 120 || August 14 || Mariners || – || || || — || || – ||
|- style="background: 
| 121 || August 15 || Mariners || – || || || — || || – ||
|- style="background: 
| 122 || August 16 || Mariners || – || || || — || || – ||
|- style="background: 
| 123 || August 17 || Mariners || – || || || — || || – ||
|- style="background: 
| 124 || August 18 || @ Cubs || – || || || — || || – ||
|- style="background: 
| 125 || August 19 || @ Cubs || – || || || — || || – ||
|- style="background: 
| 126 || August 20 || @ Cubs || – || || || — || || – ||
|- style="background: 
| 127 || August 21 || @ Athletics || – || || || — || || – ||
|- style="background: 
| 128 || August 22 || @ Athletics || – || || || — || || – ||
|- style="background: 
| 129 || August 23 || @ Athletics || – || || || — || || – ||
|- style="background: 
| 130 || August 25 || @ Mariners || – || || || — || || – ||
|- style="background: 
| 131 || August 26 || @ Mariners || – || || || — || || – ||
|- style="background: 
| 132 || August 27 || @ Mariners || – || || || — || || – ||
|- style="background: 
| 133 || August 28 || Pirates || – || || || — || || – ||
|- style="background: 
| 134 || August 29 || Pirates || – || || || — || || – ||
|- style="background: 
| 135 || August 30 || Pirates || – || || || — || || – ||
|- 
 

|- style="background: 
| 136 || September 1 || Red Sox || – || || || — || || – ||
|- style="background: 
| 137 || September 2 || Red Sox || – || || || — || || – ||
|- style="background: 
| 138 || September 3 || Red Sox || – || || || — || || – ||
|- style="background: 
| 139 || September 5 || White Sox || – || || || — || || – ||
|- style="background: 
| 140 || September 6 || White Sox || – || || || — || || – ||
|- style="background: 
| 141 || September 7 || White Sox || – || || || — || || – ||
|- style="background: 
| 142 || September 8 || @ Blue Jays || – || || || — || || – ||
|- style="background: 
| 143 || September 9 || @ Blue Jays || – || || || — || || – ||
|- style="background: 
| 144 || September 10 || @ Blue Jays || – || || || — || || – ||
|- style="background: 
| 145 || September 11 || @ White Sox || – || || || — || || – ||
|- style="background: 
| 146 || September 12 || @ White Sox || – || || || — || || – ||
|- style="background: 
| 147 || September 13 || @ White Sox || – || || || — || || – ||
|- style="background: 
| 148 || September 15 || Astros || – || || || — || || – ||
|- style="background: 
| 149 || September 16 || Astros || – || || || — || || – ||
|- style="background: 
| 150 || September 17 || Astros || – || || || — || || – ||
|- style="background: 
| 151 || September 18 || Guardians || – || || || — || || – ||
|- style="background: 
| 152 || September 19 || Guardians || – || || || — || || – ||
|- style="background: 
| 153 || September 20 || Guardians || – || || || — || || – ||
|- style="background: 
| 154 || September 22 || @ Astros || – || || || — || || – ||
|- style="background: 
| 155 || September 23 || @ Astros || – || || || — || || – ||
|- style="background: 
| 156 || September 24 || @ Astros || – || || || — || || – ||
|- style="background: 
| 157 || September 26 || @ Tigers || – || || || — || || – ||
|- style="background: 
| 158 || September 27 || @ Tigers || – || || || — || || – ||
|- style="background: 
| 159 || September 28 || @ Tigers || – || || || — || || – ||
|- style="background: 
| 160 || September 29 || Yankees || – || || || — || || – ||
|- style="background: 
| 161 || September 30 || Yankees || – || || || — || || – ||
|- style="background: 
| 162 || October 1 || Yankees || – || || || — || || – ||
|-

Current roster

Farm system

References

External links
Kansas City Royals Official Site 
2023 Kansas City Royals at Baseball Reference

Kansas City Royals
Kansas City Royals seasons
Kansas City Royals